The Clean Machine is a 1988 Australian tele movie about police corruption starring Steve Bisley. It was one of four telemovies made by Kennedy Miller around this time.

Plot
Inspector Eddie Riordan is appointed to head a new anti-corruption squad.

Production
The director was Ken Cameron:
They asked me did I want to make it on 35mm. Now, I've always wondered whether I made a big mistake by not doing it on 35mm. But I don't think it would have been a success in the cinema. It wouldn't have had the density that it had on television. In terms of big screen, I could not have had the production values; the money wouldn't have stretched that far. So I don't know. There's a turning point. You never know what these turning points mean. But I knew one of the factors was that we didn't have Mel Gibson in the lead. I think Steve's terrific in it, but to release it as a movie in that genre, you almost needed Mel or a star.
Cameron did say doing the film revived his career after the box office failure of The Umbrella Woman.

Reception
Bisley won the Best Actor in a One-off Drama accolade at the 1988 Penguin Awards.

References

External links

Australian television films
1988 films
Films produced by Doug Mitchell
Films directed by Ken Cameron
1980s English-language films
1980s Australian films